Keene is a surname. Notable people with the surname include:

 Alfred Keene (18731955), British Olympic fencer
 Alfred John Keene (18641930), British watercolour artist
 Barry Keene (born 1938), American politician (California)
 Sir Benjamin Keene (16971757), British diplomat
 Bill Keene (19272000), American television and radio personality
 Brian Keene (born 1967), American author, primarily of horror and crime fiction
 Carolyn Keene, pseudonym used 193085 by the authors of the Nancy Drew and the Dana Girls mystery stories
 Charles Keene (disambiguation), multiple people
 Christopher Keene (194695), American classical music conductor
 Constance Keene (19212005), American classical pianist
 Dalton Keene (born 1999), American football player
 Daniel Keene (born 1955), Australian playwright
 David Keene (born 1945), American former President of the National Rifle Association
 Sir David Keene, a British Lord Justice of Appeal
 Dennis Keene (born 1965), American politician (Kentucky)
 Derek Keene (born 1942), English urban historian
 Donald Keene (1922–2019), American scholar, historian, teacher, writer and translator of Japanese
 Doug Keene (192886), English footballer
 Elodie Keene (born 1949), American film and television director, producer and editor
 Edmund Keene (171481), English churchman and academic
 Foxhall P. Keene (18671941), American owner and breeder of thoroughbred race horses, World and Olympic gold medallist at polo
 Henry Keene (172676), English architect
 Henry George Keene (1826–1915) (18261915), English historian of mediaeval and modern India
 James Keene (disambiguation), multiple people
 Jasmine Keene (born 1987), Australian netball player
 Jean Keene ("The Eagle Lady", 19232009), American rodeo trick rider
 John Keene (disambiguation), multiple people
 Joseph Keene (18391921), American Medal of Honor recipient
 Judith Keene (active 19772008), Commandant of Cadets at the U.S. Coast Guard Academy
 Katy Keene, strip cartoon character created by Bill Woggon in 1945
 M. Lamar Keene (193696), American spirit medium
 Laura Keene (182673), British stage actor and manager
 Laurie Keene (born 1961), Australian rules footballer
 Marcus Keene (born 1995), American basketball player
 Marion Keene (Marion Davis, active early 1950safter 1998), British big-band vocalist
 Mimi Keene (born 1998), British actress
 Nelson Keene (born Malcolm Holland, 1942), British pop singer
 Nietzchka Keene (19522004), American film director and writer
 Paul K. Keene (19102005), American organic farming pioneer
 Percival Keene, coming-of-age adventure novel published in three volumes in 1842 by Frederick Marryat
 Ralph Keene (1902–1963), Indian-born British screenwriter, producer and film director
 Raymond Keene (born 1948), English chess Grandmaster
 Richard Keene (182594), British photographer
 Rick Keene (Richard J. "Rick" Keene, born 1957), American politician (California)
 Spec Keene (Roy S. "Spec" Keene, 18941977), American college sports coach
 Steve Keene (born 1957), American artist
 Tom Keene (disambiguation), multiple people
 Violet Keene (18931987), Canadian photographer
 William Keene (19151992), American television actor

See also 
 Allan Perry-Keene (18981987), British military airman
 Keane (disambiguation)
 Keen (surname)
 Kene, another name